The Gaziemir railway station (Gaziemir garı in Turkish) is a railway station in Gaziemir.

History
The station was opened in 1856, when the Oriental Railway Company built its line to Gaziemir. The line was then continued to Aydın and in 1866, the station was opened to regular passenger service. The ORC was taken over by the Turkish State Railways in 1935 and the station became theirs. The station served as the terminus for trains headed to İzmir since 2006, due to construction of the Şirinyer Rail Tunnel. In 2009 however trains once again continued into İzmir.

Railway stations in İzmir Province
Railway stations opened in 1856
1866 establishments in the Ottoman Empire
Railway stations closed in 2006
2006 disestablishments in Turkey
Gaziemir District